The Forty-sixth Oklahoma Legislature was a meeting of the legislative branch of the government of Oklahoma, composed of the Senate and the House of Representatives. It met in Oklahoma City from January 7, 1997, to January 5, 1999, during the second two years of the first term of Governor Frank Keating.

Dates of sessions
Organizational day: January 7, 1997
First session: February–May 1997
Second session: February–May 1998
Previous: 45th Legislature • Next: 47th Legislature

Party composition

Senate

House of Representatives

Major legislation

Enacted

1998
Tax cut - The state legislature passed the first cut in the state’s income tax in 50 years. It was combined with reductions in the sales tax, estate tax, and unemployment tax.

Leadership

Senate
President Pro Tem of the Senate: Stratton Taylor

House of Representatives

Democratic
 Speaker: Lloyd Benson
 Speaker Pro Tempore: Larry Adair

Republican
 Minority leader: Larry Ferguson

Members

Senate

Table based on list of state senators. Districts 25, 27, 28, 36, and 53 did not exist in 1997.

House of Representatives

Table based on government database.

References

Oklahoma legislative sessions
1997 in Oklahoma
1998 in Oklahoma
1997 U.S. legislative sessions
1998 U.S. legislative sessions